XV Solos for a German Flute, Hoboy, or Violin with a Thorough Bass for the Harpsichord or Bass Violin was published by Friedrich Chrysander in 1879. The 72-page volume contains sonatas, for various instruments, composed by or attributed to George Frideric Handel. The words on the cover of the publication are: Sonate da Camera di G.F.Handel. The publication includes all the sonatas as published by Walsh in 1732; and those sonatas, as well as extras included by Chrysander, include the body of work that is known as Handel's "Opus 1".

In addition to the 15 sonatas indicated by the title of the publication, Chrysander appended the scores of four additional sonatas, making nineteen in all. The first sixteen sonatas (Ia, Ib, and numbers II to XV) were included as part of the HG volume 27. Sonata VI and the final four sonatas were included as part of HG volume 48 (pp. 112–139).

The musical instrument mentioned at the start of each sonata does not always match the instrument for which the work was originally written by Handel, however Chrysander was aware that the sale of the publication would be enhanced by the inclusion of a wide variety of instruments.

Each sonata displays the melody and bass lines—with the expectation that a competent keyboard player would supply the omitted inner parts based on the figured bass markings.

Despite the title, there are five instruments mentioned in the work: the Western concert flute, the recorder, the oboe, the violin, and the viola da gamba.

Summary

The following table lists each of the sonatas included by Chrysander in his publication of 1879, as well as information about the instrument, the key, and the original sonata by Handel.

See also

List of solo sonatas by George Frideric Handel
Publications by Friedrich Chrysander
Handel solo sonatas (publication by Walsh)
Handel flute sonatas

References

External links
Handel – 19 Sonatas For Various Instruments (Chrysander)
Handel – Sonatas (Walsh), 1732 edition ("Note: This is more corect  than the former edition")

Sonatas by George Frideric Handel